Rui Manuel Castanheira do Rêgo (born 5 July 1980 in Mujães, Viana do Castelo) is a Portuguese former professional footballer who played as a goalkeeper.

References

External links
 

1980 births
Living people
People from Viana do Castelo
Sportspeople from Viana do Castelo District
Portuguese footballers
Association football goalkeepers
Primeira Liga players
Liga Portugal 2 players
Segunda Divisão players
S.C. Braga B players
S.C. Braga players
F.C. Marco players
F.C. Lixa players
G.D. Chaves players
S.C. Beira-Mar players
Vilaverdense F.C. players
Merelinense F.C. players